The Gonin Medal is an international award given to one ophthalmologist every four years by the International Council of Ophthalmology. The award is named in honor of Swiss ophthalmologist Jules Gonin. It has been said to represent "the highest achievement in ophthalmology."

Recipients
Source: Retina Research Foundation
2018: Jean-Jacques De Laey
2014: Alice McPherson
2010: Alan C. Bird
2006: Alfred Sommer
2002: Gottfried Naumann
1998: Robert Machemer
1994: Harold L. Ridley
1990: Barrie R. Jones
1986: Akira Nakajima
1982: Alfred Edward Maumenee
1978: Norman Henry Ashton
1974: David G. Cogan
1970: Gerhard Meyer-Schwickerath
1966: Jules François
1962: Hans Goldmann
1958: Alan Woods
1954: Stewart Duke-Elder
1950: Hermenegildo Arruga
1945: Paul Bailliart
1941: Alfred Vogt

See also 

 List of medicine awards
 Garland W. Clay Award: an ophthalmology award given by the American Academy of Optometry

References

Ophthalmology
Medicine awards
Awards established in 1937
1937 establishments in Switzerland